Plotius Tucca (fl. 35 BC) was a Roman poet and a friend of Virgil. He was in the circle of friends with Virgil and Maecenas, as indicated by Horace (Satires). According to Donatus's Life of Virgil, after Virgil's death, Plotius was one of two executors of Virgil's literary remains—one of two who helped publish the Aeneid on Augustus's orders (the other being Varius Rufus).

Plotius is known today only in connection with the poetry of Horace and Virgil.

References
Harrison, Stephen J. "Plotius Tucca." In Hornblower, Simon and Antony Spawforth, eds. The Oxford Classical Dictionary. Oxford: Oxford UP, 2003. 1200.
Hollis, A. S. "L. Varius Rufus, De Morte (Frs. 1-4 Morel)". In The Classical Quarterly, New Series, 27(1),1977. 187-190

1st-century BC Roman poets
Golden Age Latin writers
Virgil
Latin writers known only from secondary sources
1st-century BC Romans
Plautii